Sergio Debut solo album by American actor and singer Sergio Blass ex Menudo, It was released in 1994

Track listing
 "Somos la luz del mañana"
 "No voy a llorar"
 "Como el sol"
 "Como jamas a nadie ame"
 "No puedo olvidarme de ti"
 "Siempre te amare" Spanish Version of The Police's 1983 Hit Every Breath You Take
 "Corre bebe"
 "Estoy buscandote"
 "Mientes"
 "Regresa a mi"
 "Te perdiste lo mejor"
 "Espérame"
 "Chico malote"
 "Forajido"
 "Viento"

1994 albums
Sergio Blass albums